Sam Chuk is a district (amphoe) in the northern part of Suphan Buri province, central Thailand.

History
Originally the district name was Nang Buat. In 1911 when the government separated part of Nang Buat District and established Doem Bang district, it also moved the district office to Ban Sam Pheng, Tambon Sam Chuk. In 1939 the district name was changed to Sam Chuk as the central tambon.

Geography
Neighbouring districts are (from the south clockwise): Si Prachan, Don Chedi, Nong Ya Sai and Doem Bang Nang Buat of Suphan Buri Province, and Sawaeng Ha of Ang Thong province.

The main water resource of Sam Chuk is the Tha Chin River or Suphan river.

Economy

Thailand's Sam Chuk community and Old Market District along the Tha Chin River was granted an Award of Merit in the 2009 United Nations Educational, Scientific and Cultural Organization (UNESCO) Asia-Pacific Heritage Awards for Culture Heritage Conservation. Local residents formed a Sam Chuk Market Conservation Committee. They preserved what they received from their ancestors and restored 19 local buildings, adapting the old style architecture described in Thai as khanompang khing ('ginger bread') style, into a contemporary market.

Administration

Central administration 
Sam Chuk is divided into seven sub-districts (tambons), which are further subdivided into 68 administrative villages (mubans).

Local administration 
There is one sub-district municipality (thesaban tambon) in the district:
 Sam Chuk consisting of sub-district Sam Chuk and parts of sub-districts Yan Yao and Krasiao.

There are six sub-district administrative organizations (SAO) in the district:
 Yan Yao consisting of parts of sub-district Yan Yao.
 Wang Luek consisting of sub-district Wang Luek.
 Nong Phak Nak consisting of sub-district Nong Phak Nak.
 Ban Sa consisting of sub-district Ban Sa.
 Nong Sadao consisting of sub-district Nong Sadao.
 Krasiao consisting of parts of sub-district Krasiao.

In media
Sam Chuk  was cited in the 2009 same name Thai film as a backdrop of whole story and a location for filming. The film is based on the true story that happened here about a group of boy students who are involved in drugs, directed by Tanit Jitnukul.

References

External links

amphoe.com

Sam Chuk